The Federal Migration Service (Федеральная миграционная служба, ФМС России) was a federal law enforcement agency of Russia responsible for implementing the state policy on migration and also performing law enforcement functions, functions for control, supervision, and provision of public services in the field of migration. The Federal Migration Service was responsible for the issuing of Russian international passports, resident registration and immigration control in Russia. Headquartered in Moscow, FMS was charged with the investigation and enforcement of over 500 federal statutes within the Russian Federation. FMS is led by a Director who is appointed by the Prime Minister of Russia.

FMS was the one of the largest investigative agency in the Russian government, following the Federal Security Service of the Russian Federation, Investigative Committee of Russia and the FSKN.

The Russian Federal Migration Service was created on June 14, 1992, replacing the Migration Committee of the Ministry of Labor and Employment. The service was established on the basis of Governmental Decree No. 740 from September 22, 1992.

On April 5, 2016, the FMS was dissolved, and its functions and authorities were transferred to the Main Directorate for Migration Affairs, part of the Ministry of Internal Affairs (MVD).

History 
The Russian Federal Migration Service was created on June 14, 1992, replacing the Migration Committee of the Ministry of Labor and Employment.

In 1999, President of Russia Boris Yeltsin signed a decree to dissolve the FMS and reestablish it as Ministry for Federation Affairs, Nationalities and Migration Policy.

In 2001 the Ministry was dissolved and its functions were transferred to the MVD.

On February 23, 2002, President Putin organized the establishment of the Department for Migration Affairs under the MVD.

On July 19, 2004, President Putin signed a decree to re-establish the Federal Migration Service. The service was reorganized in its current form by Presidential Decree No. 928 of July 19, 2004 "Issues of the Federal Migration Service".

The territorial organs of the FMS of Russia were established on January 1, 2006, bringing together the Passport and Visa Service and the Immigration Division of the Ministry of Internal Affairs.

Until 2012, the service was under the jurisdiction of the MVD. From 2012 til 2016, FMS was under direct subordinate of the Russian Government.

Structure
 Law Directorate
 Directorate for Analytic organization
 Directorate for Immigration Control (Управление иммиграционного контроля)
 Directorate for Citizenship Affairs
 Office for immigrants
 Directorate for the organization of visas and registration
 Directorate of external labor migration
 Directorate for the organization of passports and registration of public accounting
 Department of International and Public Affairs
 Directorate of Compatriots Affairs
 Inspection and Accountability Office
 Financial and Economic Affairs
 Department of organizing activities for mobilization training
 Center for citizens, passport and visa issues
 Center for Logistics
 Information Center
 Centers for temporary accommodation of displaced persons
 Centers for Medical and psychological rehabilitation of displaced persons
 Department for Base material and technical resources
 Center for temporary accommodation of immigrants
 Training Center
 Federal State Institution "Center for the detention of persons subject to readmission"

Professional holiday
Since 2007, June 14 is the official Day of the worker of the Migration Service in the Russian Federation.

Directors of the Federal Migration Service

See also

 Federal crime
 U.S. Immigration and Customs Enforcement
 Federal Security Service of the Russian Federation
 Federal Customs Service of Russia

References

External links

 
 FMS Moscow 
 FMS Saint Petersburg
 BBC News Article detailing the FMS' poor treatment of migrants and the racist attitudes of FMS staff

International agencies comparable to FMS
 U.S. Immigration and Customs Enforcement
 Canada Border Services Agency
 Serious Organized Crime Agency—UK
 RCMP Integrated Border Enforcement Teams—Canada
 SVA Customs Surveillance Service—Spain
 Bundesgrenzschutz

Federal law enforcement agencies of Russia
Government agencies established in 2004
2004 establishments in Russia
Organizations based in Moscow
Specialist law enforcement agencies of Russia
Defunct government agencies of Russia